Curci is an Italian surname that may refer to
Amelita Galli-Curci (1882–1963), Italian soprano 
Amelita Galli-Curci Estate in New York, U.S.
Galli-Curci Theatre in New York, U.S.
Carlo Curci (1846-after 1916), Italian painter 
Carlo Maria Curci (1810–1891), Italian theologian 
Fran Curci (born 1938), American football player and coach 
Freddy Curci (born 1962), Canadian rock vocalist and songwriter 
Gianluca Curci (born 1985), Italian football goalkeeper 
Ofelia Giudicissi Curci (1934–1981), Italian poet and archeologist

Italian-language surnames